United Nations Security Council resolution 592, adopted on 8 December 1986, having considered a letter from the representative of Zimbabwe in his capacity as Chairman of the Movement of Non-Aligned Countries, the Council reaffirmed the Geneva Conventions and condemned the opening of fire at a student demonstration by the Israel Defense Forces, in which two students were killed at Birzeit University.

The Council called on Israel to abide by the Geneva Conventions, release any demonstrators detained at Birzeit University and called on all parties to exercise maximum restraint in the situation. It also requested the Secretary-General to submit a report on the implementation of the current resolution than 20 December 1986. The report later described the Israeli position as acting with "proportionate force" to contain the disturbance, which had originated from elements of the Palestine Liberation Organisation. Israel also said the rules of the Geneva Convention did not legally apply to the territory although it would implement humanitarian elements of the resolution.

The resolution was adopted by 14 votes in favour to none against, with one abstention from the United States.

See also
 Arab–Israeli conflict
 Israeli–Palestinian conflict
 List of United Nations Security Council Resolutions 501 to 600 (1982–1987)

References

External links
 
Text of the Resolution at undocs.org

 0592
 0592
1986 in Israel
Israeli–Palestinian conflict and the United Nations
Birzeit University
December 1986 events